Ivan Lendl was the defending champion, but did not participate this year.

Pete Sampras won the title, defeating Amos Mansdorf, 6–1, 7–6(7–4), 2–6, 7–6(7–2) in the final.

Seeds

Draw

Finals

Top half

Section 1

Section 2

Section 3

Section 4

References

 Main Draw

U.S. Pro Indoor
1992 ATP Tour